Mynydd y Drum is a hill on the border between the county of Powys and Neath Port Talbot County Borough, south Wales.  The summit of the hill is in Neath Port Talbot (formerly the county of Glamorgan) at 298m and lies towards the western end of a broad curving ridge, the larger part of which is in Powys (former county of Brecknockshire).  The eastern half of the hill is currently being opencasted for coal. The hill is sometimes referred to simply as The Drum (a Welsh word, so pronounced 'drim').

Geology
The hill is formed from sandstones and mudstones of the South Wales Coal Measures which also contain numerous coal seams currently being worked within the large Nant Helen Opencast Coal Mine.

Archaeology and industrial archaeology
Several cairns of unknown age are found around the summit plateau though that formerly known as Garn Goch has been obliterated by the opencasting. The remains of numerous nineteenth century tramroads are scattered around the flanks of the hill, notably that of Claypon's Tramroad extension, one of the later parts of the Brecon Forest Tramroad linking Onllwyn with Ystalyfera in the Swansea Valley.

Access
Other than the area being opencasted, much of the hill is designated as open country and therefore available for walkers to wander over at will. Various public footpaths and bridleways provide access over its lower slopes from the communities in the upper Swansea Valley such as Abercraf and Ystradgynlais and from Seven Sisters/Blaendulais at the head of the Dulais valley to the southeast.

Folklore
There is a legend that three cauldrons of gold are buried on the hill's summit, guarded by demons. There is a prophecy that the treasure will one day be claimed by a young girl.

References

External links
 images of Mynydd y Drum and surrounding area on geograph website

Mountains and hills of Powys
Mountains and hills of Neath Port Talbot